is a professional Japanese baseball player. He plays outfielder for the Orix Buffaloes.

Mune's father is Guinean and his mother is also of at least partial West African descent.

References 

1996 births
Living people
Baseball people from Tokyo
Nippon Professional Baseball outfielders
Orix Buffaloes players
Melbourne Aces players
Japanese expatriate baseball players in Australia
Japanese people of Guinean descent